Sagebrush Heroes is a 1945 American Western film directed by Benjamin H. Kline and written by Luci Ward. The film stars Charles Starrett, Dub Taylor, Constance Worth, Jimmy Wakely, Ozie Waters and Elvin Field. The film was released on February 1, 1945, by Columbia Pictures.

Plot

Cast          
Charles Starrett as Steve Randall / The Durango Kid
Dub Taylor as Cannonball
Constance Worth as Connie Pearson
Jimmy Wakely as Jimmy
Ozie Waters as Calico Jones
Elvin Field as Marty Jones
Bobby Larson as Tim
Forrest Taylor as Tom Goodwin
Joel Friedkin as Doctor Webb
Lane Chandler as Colton
Paul Conrad as Brady 
Eddie Laughton as Layton
John Tyrrell as Finley

References

External links
 

1945 films
American Western (genre) films
1945 Western (genre) films
Columbia Pictures films
American black-and-white films
1940s English-language films
1940s American films